Gilmer County Poor Farm Infirmary is a historic poor farm infirmary building located near Glenville, Gilmer County, West Virginia. It was built in 1907, and is a two-story, three bay, center entrance frame building with a cross-hip pitched roof and Colonial Revival-style details.  The infirmary was in operation until 1941, after which it was used as a day care center and as meeting space for local social and civic organizations.

It was listed on the National Register of Historic Places in 1998.

References

Hospital buildings on the National Register of Historic Places in West Virginia
Colonial Revival architecture in West Virginia
Buildings and structures completed in 1907
Buildings and structures in Gilmer County, West Virginia
National Register of Historic Places in Gilmer County, West Virginia
Public housing in West Virginia
Poor farms
1907 establishments in West Virginia